The  2013 Italian Open (also known as the 2013 Rome Masters and sponsored title 2013 Internazionali BNL d'Italia) was a tennis tournament played on outdoor clay courts at the Foro Italico in Rome, Italy. It was the 70th edition of the Italian Open and was classified as an ATP World Tour Masters 1000 event on the 2013 ATP World Tour and a Premier 5 event on the 2013 WTA Tour. It took place from 13 to 19 May 2013.

Points and prize money

Point distribution

Prize money

ATP main draw entrants

Singles

Seeds

 Rankings are as of May 6, 2013.

Other entrants
The following players received wildcards into the main draw:
  Paolo Lorenzi
  Potito Starace
  Matteo Viola
  Filippo Volandri

The following players received entry from the qualifying draw:
  Carlos Berlocq
  Santiago Giraldo
  Andrey Golubev
  Ernests Gulbis
  Jan Hájek
  Andrey Kuznetsov
  Albert Montañés

The following player received entry as a lucky loser:
  Lukáš Rosol

Withdrawals
Before the tournament
  Thomaz Bellucci
  Mardy Fish
  Florian Mayer
  Janko Tipsarević (bronchitis)
  Bernard Tomic (personal reasons)
During the tournament
  Philipp Kohlschreiber
  Stanislas Wawrinka (thigh injury)

Retirements
  Xavier Malisse (right wrist injury)
  Andy Murray (hip injury)

Doubles

Seeds

 Rankings are as of May 6, 2013.

Other entrants
The following pairs received wildcards into the doubles main draw:
  Flavio Cipolla /  Filippo Volandri
  Paolo Lorenzi /  Potito Starace

Withdrawals
Before the tournament
  Xavier Malisse (right wrist injury)

WTA main draw entrants

Singles

Seeds

 Rankings are as of May 6, 2013.

Other entrants
The following players received wildcards into the main draw:
  Nastassja Burnett
  Karin Knapp
  Flavia Pennetta

The following players received entry from the qualifying draw:
  Mallory Burdette
  Simona Halep
  Andrea Hlaváčková
  Mathilde Johansson
  Anabel Medina Garrigues
  Garbiñe Muguruza
  Melanie Oudin
  Lesia Tsurenko

The following player received entry as a lucky loser:
  Lourdes Domínguez Lino

Withdrawals
Before the tournament
  Mona Barthel
  Marion Bartoli (foot injury)
  Angelique Kerber (abdominal injury)
  Tamira Paszek (respiratory infection)
  Yaroslava Shvedova (right arm injury)
  Heather Watson (mononucleosis)
During the tournament
  Maria Sharapova (illness)

Retirements
  Maria Kirilenko
  Ekaterina Makarova (left Achilles tendon injury)
  Ayumi Morita

Doubles

Seeds

 Rankings are as of May 6, 2013.

Other entrants
The following pairs received wildcards into the doubles main draw:
  Nastassja Burnett /  Christina McHale
  Maria Elena Camerin /  Karin Knapp
  Jelena Janković /  Mirjana Lučić-Baroni
  Flavia Pennetta /  Svetlana Kuznetsova
The following pair received entry as alternates:
  Catalina Castaño /  Mariana Duque Mariño

Withdrawals
Before the tournament
  Ekaterina Makarova (left achillis injury)

Champions

Men's singles

 Rafael Nadal def.  Roger Federer, 6–1, 6–3.

Women's singles

 Serena Williams def.  Victoria Azarenka, 6–1, 6–3

Men's doubles

 Bob Bryan /  Mike Bryan def.  Mahesh Bhupathi /  Rohan Bopanna, 6–2, 6–3

Women's doubles

 Hsieh Su-wei /  Peng Shuai def.  Sara Errani /  Roberta Vinci, 4–6, 6–3, [10–8]

References

External links
Official website

 
Italian Open
Italian Open
2013 Italian Open (Tennis)
Tennis